A machinist is a tradesperson or trained professional.

Machinist or Machinists may also refer to:
Peter Machinist, American historian
The Machinist,  2004 psychological thriller film 
The Machinists, 2012 British documentary film